Gordon Kirby (born in Brighton, England) is a Canadian auto racing journalist. He is the United States editor for Autocourse since 1973 and Motor Sport since 2008.

Kirby was raised in Toronto and began working in 1968 as Canadian correspondent for British magazine Autosport. He was United States correspondent for Autosport from 1973 to 2004.

Kirby also was co-founder of magazine OnTrack, Indy Car Racing and Racer, editor to AutoWeek, and contributor to Car and Driver and other outlets. He also was ghostwriter for several Indy car drivers.

Publications 

 Penske's Maestro: Karl Kainhofer & the History of Penske Racing (Racemaker Press, 2016) 
 Tony Bettenhausen & Sons: An American Racing Family Album (Racemaker Press, 2016) 
 Second to One: All But For Indy (co-authored with Joe Freeman; Racemaker Press, 2015) 
 Jim McGee: Crew Chief of Champions (Racemaker Press, May, 2014) 
 Rick Mears - Thanks: the story of Rick Mears and the Mears Gang (Crash Media Group/Autocourse, 2008) 
 A Winning Adventure: Honda's Ten Years in CART (co-authored with John Oreovicz ; David Bull Publishing, 2003) 
 Mario Andretti: A Driving Passion (David Bull Publishing, 2001) 
 Greg Moore: A Legacy of Spirit (with Dan Proudfoot and Jim Taylor; Whitecap Books, 2000) 
 Bobby Rahal: The Graceful Champion (David Bull Publishing, 1999) 
 Unser: An American Family Portrait (Anlon Press / Henry Holt & Co., 1988) 
 The Art of Motor Racing with Emerson Fittipaldi (Nutmeg Productions, 1987)

References

External links 
 Official website
 The Way It Is: Forty years covering American racing, Gordon Kirby, 23 April 2012
 Gordon Kirby at Motor Sport Magazine

Canadian sportswriters
Canadian magazine editors
Motorsport journalists
Living people
Year of birth missing (living people)